Nankin is an unincorporated community in southern Orange Township, Ashland County, Ohio, United States. It has a post office with the ZIP code 44848.  It lies at the intersection of State Routes 58 and 302 and is near U.S. 250.

History
Nankin was originally called Orange, and under the latter name was laid out in 1828. A post office called Nankin has been in operation since 1833.

References

Unincorporated communities in Ohio
Unincorporated communities in Ashland County, Ohio
1828 establishments in Ohio
Populated places established in 1828